Cornwell can refer to:

People
 Almon Cornwell (1820–1893), American farmer-politician in Wisconsin
 Anita Cornwell (born 1923), American author
 Bernard Cornwell (born 1944), British historical novelist
 Charlotte Cornwell (1949–2021), British actress
 David Cornwell (1931–2020), English writer of espionage novels writing as John le Carré
 David L. Cornwell (1945–2012), U.S. Representative from Indiana
 Dean Cornwell (1892–1960), American illustrator and muralist
 Edna Brady Cornwell (1868–1958), wife of former Governor of West Virginia John J. Cornwell
 Eve Cornwell, British YouTuber and former lawyer
 Grant Cornwell, eleventh President of The College of Wooster, in Wooster, Ohio, USA
 Greg Cornwell (born 1938), Australian politician
 Hugh Cornwell (born 1949), English musician and songwriter, lead singer with The Stranglers
 John Cornwell (born 1940), English journalist and historian
 John J. Cornwell (1867–1953), American politician
 John Travers Cornwell (Jack Cornwell) (1900–1916), English naval hero, Victoria Cross recipient; Battle of Jutland, Denmark, 1916
 Judy Cornwell (born 1940), English actress and novelist
 Marshall S. Cornwell (18 October 1871–1898), American newspaper publisher, writer, and poet
 Matt Cornwell (born 1985), English rugby union player
 Patricia Cornwell (born 1956), American author
 Phil Cornwell (born 1957), English comedian, actor, impressionist and writer
 Stanley Cornwell Lewis (1905–2009), British portrait painter and illustrator
 W. Don Cornwell (born 1948), CEO Granite Broadcasting
 William B. Cornwell (1864–1926) American lawyer, businessperson, newspaper editor and publisher, and railroad and timber executive
 William H. Cornwell (1843–1903), American businessman and Hawaiian politician
 William J. Cornwell (1809–1896), New York politician
 Benjamin O. Cornwell (born 1981), American physician
 Trenton L. Cornwell (born 1983), American pastor

Places
 Cornwell, Florida
 Cornwell, Kentucky
 Cornwell, Oxfordshire
 Cornwell, Virginia
 Cornwells Heights (SEPTA station), SEPTA Regional Rail station Bensalem Township, Pennsylvania, USA
 Mount Cornwell (Antarctica), 2,460metre-high mountain in Antarctica
 Mount Cornwell (Canada)
 Cornwells Heights-Eddington, census-designated place (CDP) in Bucks County, Pennsylvania, United States

Other 
Cornwell Tools, Wadsworth, Ohio-based professional tool manufacturer for the automotive and aviation industries